The Center for the Fundamental Laws of Nature is a research center at Harvard University that focuses on theoretical particle physics and cosmology.

About 
The Center for the Fundamental Laws of nature is the high-energy theory group in Harvard's Physics Department. , it had 12 faculty and affiliate faculty, 18 postdoctoral, and 19 graduate student members, in addition to multiple affiliates, visiting scholars, and staff. A number of prominent particle theorists have earned degrees or worked at Harvard, including Nobel Laureates David Politzer (PhD 1974), Sheldon Glashow (PhD 1959), David Gross, Steven Weinberg, and Julian Schwinger.

Research 
Current areas of research listed include:

 Quantum gravity
 String theory
 Black holes
 Applications of AdS/CFT
 Physics beyond the standard model
 Dark matter
 Effective field theories

References

External links
Official Website

Theoretical physics institutes
Harvard University